Montana Fay Fouts (born June 4, 2000) is an American All-American softball pitcher for the Alabama Crimson Tide. She is best known for pitching a perfect game against UCLA in the 2021 Women's College World Series.

Early life
Fouts attended East Carter High School in Grayson, Kentucky, where she was named Kentucky's Miss Softball and Kentucky's state Gatorade Player of the Year in softball in 2016, 2017, and 2018. Fouts holds the Kentucky high school softball ERA record for a pitcher of 0.16 earned runs allowed per game, and set a single-season high school record in the state for the most perfect games (9) and no-hitters (14). Fouts had 111 career high school wins with 1,483 strikeouts, 77 shutouts, 25 no-hitters and 15 perfect games.

Playing career
Fouts committed to Alabama in 2014, during her freshman year of high school.

Freshman year
Fouts made her debut for Alabama on February 8, 2019 against Troy, getting nine strikeouts with one run allowed and four hits.  In her freshman year, she went 21-6 in games that she  started, had an ERA of 1.39, and threw 193 strikeouts.   Fouts led Alabama softball to a berth in the 2019 Women's College World Series where she pitched shutouts against Arizona and Oklahoma. Eventually, Alabama lost to Oklahoma 7-3 in the second game of the semifinals.  Fouts was named the 2019 SEC Freshman of the Year and was on the 2019 SEC All-Freshman team.

In August 2019, Fouts received an invitation to try out for the United States women's national softball team competing in the 2020 Summer Olympics, but did not make the team.

Sophomore year
During the 2020 season that was eventually shortened by the COVID-19 pandemic, Fouts went 3-3 with a career-high 2.04 ERA and 41 strikeouts.

Junior year
During the 2021 season in her junior year, Fouts went 27-4 with a 1.61 ERA and 349 strikeouts.  She led Alabama to their first SEC tournament championship since 2012, defeating Florida 4-0 in the final round on May 15, 2021 and being named tournament MVP. Fouts recorded 39 strikeouts in the tournament over the course of three days, setting a new tournament record. 

In the 2021 Women's College World Series, Fouts led Alabama to a 5-1 victory against Arizona with a career-high 16 strikeouts.  Fouts pitched the sixth perfect game in Women's College World Series history, and the first since Courtney Blades in 2000 in a 6–0 victory over UCLA. During the semifinal round of the tournament against Florida State, Fouts allowed seven runs before being replaced by pitcher Lexi Kilfoyl in the third inning, and Alabama eventually was eliminated after losing the game 8-5.  Fouts and teammate Bailey Hemphill were named by NCAA to the 2021 Women's College World Series All-Tournament Team.  In addition, she also won the 2021 NFCA National Pitcher of the Year, 2021 D1Softball Pitcher of the Year, and the 2021 SEC Pitcher of the Year awards.

Senior year
During the 2022 season in her senior year, Fouts appeared in 39 games, including 36 starts, posting a 24-8 record with a 2.10 ERA and 277 strikeouts. She earned four SEC Pitcher of the Week awards, the most weekly awards of any player in the conference, and led the SEC in strikeouts. Following the season, Fouts was named a top-25 finalist for the USA Softball Collegiate Player of the Year and  a second-team All-American.

Statistics

References

External links
 
Alabama Crimson Tide bio
USA Softball Bio

2000 births
Softball players from Kentucky
Alabama Crimson Tide softball players
Living people
People from Grayson, Kentucky
Competitors at the 2022 World Games
World Games gold medalists
World Games medalists in softball
21st-century American women